Neomicrocalamus is an Asian genus of bamboo in the grass family.

Species
The genus contains the following species:

 Neomicrocalamus andropogonifolius (Griff.) Stapleton – Bhutan, Arunachal Pradesh
 Neomicrocalamus dongvanensis T.Q.Nguyen – Vietnam
 Neomicrocalamus prainii (Gamble) Keng f. – Tibet, Yunnan, Meghalaya, Myanmar
 Neomicrocalamus yunnanensis (T.H.Wen) Ohrnb. – Yunnan

References

External links
 

Bambusoideae genera
Bambusoideae